Forbes County is one of the 141 Cadastral divisions of New South Wales.

Forbes County was named in honour of Chief Justice Sir Francis Forbes (1784-1841). It is located south of the Lachlan River near Forbes, down to Grenfell. It includes the area along the Lachlan east to Cowra and the Boorowa River, and also south to Koorawatha

Parishes within this county
A full list of parishes found within this county; their current LGA and mapping coordinates to the approximate centre of each location is as follows:

References

Counties of New South Wales